Russell James Edwards (born 21 December 1973) is a former English footballer who played as a defender.

Career
Edwards began his career at Crystal Palace, after playing in the club's academy. Edwards failed to make a first team appearance at Crystal Palace, and signed for Barnet in 1994. Edwards made five Football League appearances for Barnet, before moving onto Dulwich Hamlet. Following a spell at Dulwich Hamlet, Edwards moved to Welling United and Chelmsford City, before signing for Braintree Town. In November 2007, Edwards had a brief spell at Canvey Island, before moving back to Braintree, where he retired in 2008.

References

1973 births
Living people
Association football defenders
English footballers
Footballers from Beckenham
Crystal Palace F.C. players
Barnet F.C. players
Dulwich Hamlet F.C. players
Welling United F.C. players
Chelmsford City F.C. players
Braintree Town F.C. players
Canvey Island F.C. players
English Football League players